Kevin Aguiar (born September 7, 1972) is an American politician who represented the 7th Bristol district in the Massachusetts House of Representatives. He was first elected in a 2008 special election following Robert Correia's resignation to become Mayor of Fall River, Massachusetts.

From 2002 to 2009, Aguiar served as a member of the Fall School Committee. He was defeated for re-election in the 2012 Democratic primary by challenger Alan Silvia, who succeeded him.

References

1972 births
Democratic Party members of the Massachusetts House of Representatives
Politicians from Fall River, Massachusetts
University of Massachusetts Dartmouth alumni
Cambridge College alumni
Living people